Giuseppe Ruffoni (16 December 1895 – 28 December 1959) was an Italian racing cyclist. He rode in the 1923 Tour de France.

References

1895 births
1959 deaths
Italian male cyclists
Place of birth missing